Cricket Board of Maldives is the official governing body of the sport of cricket in Maldives. Its current headquarters is in Male, Maldives. Cricket Board of Maldives is the Maldives representative at the International Cricket Council and is an associate member and has been a member of that body since 2001. It is also a member of the Asian Cricket Council.

References

External links
Official site of the Cricket Board of Maldives

Maldives
Cricket in the Maldives